Lucky, the Inscrutable is a 1967 Spanish-Italian-German spy film directed by Jesús Franco and starring Ray Danton. It marked the first collaboration between Franco and the Italian composer Bruno Nicolai, who worked together many times in the following years. Franco said he and Nicolai were neighbors, which made working together convenient (Franco played not one, but three, small cameo roles in this film).

This film was Franco's first Spanish-Italian-German co-production, and was also his first film for German producer Artur Brauner. It was also Italian actress Rosalba Neri's first Franco film. Patty Shepard, 21 in this film, went on to become a famous cult star of Spanish horror cinema several years later. The film was not shown theatrically in the USA. The most complete print is the Italian print, running at 92 minutes.

Cast

References

External links

1967 films
Italian spy comedy films
Spanish spy comedy films
West German films
1960s Italian-language films
Films directed by Jesús Franco
1960s spy comedy films
Films set in Italy
Italian superhero films
Films set in Albania
1967 comedy films
Parody films based on James Bond films
1960s Italian films
1960s Spanish films